The Netaji S.C.Bose Gomoh–Hatia line is a railway line connecting NSC Bose Gomoh and  in the Indian state of Jharkhand. It is under the jurisdiction of East Central Railway and South Eastern Railway.

History
The -wide narrow-gauge Purulia–Ranchi line was opened by Bengal Nagpur Railway in 1907.

The construction of this line included the conversion of the narrow-gauge Kotshila–Ranchi line to broad gauge.

The narrow-gauge Purulia–Kotshila sector  was converted to broad gauge in 1992.

Electrification
The Gomoh–Chandrapura–Phusro sector was electrified in 1957–58, Rajabera-Bokaro Steel City in 1986–87, Bokaro Steel City yard in 1988–89, Radhagaon–Muri–Kita in 1998–99, Kita–Namkom in 2000–2001, Namkum–Ranchi–Hatia in 2001–2002, Purulia–Kotshila in 1998–99.

Loco sheds
Netaji SC Bose Gomoh has an electric loco shed with capacity to hold 125+ locos. Locos housed at the shed include WAG-7, WAG-9, WAG-9I, WAP-7. WAP-7 locos serve the prestigious Howrah Rajdhani Express.

 has a diesel loco shed with WDM-2 and WDM-3A locos. It has a large yard for Bokaro Steel Plant.

Railway reorganisation
In 1952, Eastern Railway was formed with a portion of East Indian Railway Company, east of Mughalsarai and Bengal Nagpur Railway.  In 1955, South Eastern Railway was carved out of Eastern Railway. It comprised lines mostly operated by BNR earlier.       East Central Railway was created in 1996–97.

Some major trains on this route:-
Purushottam Express
Ranchi Rajdhani Express
Bokaro Steel City–Bhubaneswar Garib Rath Express
Bhubaneswar Rajdhani Express
Howrah–Ranchi Shatabdi Express
Odisha Sampark Kranti Express
Jharkhand Sampark Kranti Express
Sambalpur–Jammu Tawi Express
Jharkhand Swarna Jayanti Express
Tatanagar–Amritsar Jallianwalla Bagh Express
Ahmedabad–Kolkata Express
Shaktipunj Express
Howrah–Bhopal Weekly Express
Ranchi–New Delhi Garib Rath Express
Sambalpur–Varanasi Express
Ranchi–Kamakhya Express

Rail sections of this route:-
 Hatia–Ranchi section
 Ranchi–Johna section and Ranchi–Gautamdhara section (tracks split due to hilly terrain)
 Johna-Muri section and Gautamdhara–Muri section (tracks meet in Muri)
 Muri–Kotshila section
 Kotshila–Bokaro Steel City section
 Bokaro Steel City–Chandrapura section
 Chandrapura-Gomoh section

References

External links
Trains at NSC Bose Gomoh
Trains at Bokaro Steel City
Trains at Muri
Trains at Ranchi

|

5 ft 6 in gauge railways in India
Rail transport in Jharkhand
Rail transport in West Bengal

Transport in Ranchi